The fourth edition of the European Race Walking Cup took place in the Slovak city of Dudince on Saturday May 19, 2001.

Complete results were published. The junior events are documented on the World Junior Athletics History webpages.  Medal winners were published on the Athletics Weekly website,

Medallists

Abbreviations
All times shown are in hours:minutes:seconds

Men's results

20 km walk

Team (20 km Men)

50 km walk

Team (50 km Men)

Men's 10 km (Junior)

†: Extra athlete (illegible for Team and individual results)

Team (10 km Junior Men)

Women's results

20 km walk

Team (20 km Women)

Women's 10 km Junior

†: Extra athlete (illegible for Team and individual results)

Team (10 km Junior Women)

Participation
The participation of 273 athletes ( men/ women) + 8 guests (4 men/4 women) in the Junior events from 30 countries is reported.

 (1)
 (16+2)
 (1)
 (8)
 (3)
 (5)
 (6)
 (18+2)
 (18)
 (11)
 (17+1)
 (5)
 (13)
 (7)
 (10+1)
 (1)
 (1)
 (6)
 (13)
 (12)
 (12)
 (18)
 (17)
 (18)
 (4)
 (4)
 (3)
 (16+2)
 (6)
 Yugoslavia (3)

See also
2001 Race Walking Year Ranking

References

External links
IAAF Men's 2000 Year Ranking
IAAF Women's 2000 Year Ranking
gbrathletics
athletissimo

2001
Race Walking
Race Walking
International athletics competitions hosted by Slovakia